Carex radiata, the eastern star sedge, is a species of flowering plant in the family Cyperaceae, native to central and eastern North America. It is cultivated for its yellowish-green foliage and its relatively—for a sedge—showy flowers.

References

radiata
Flora of Manitoba
Flora of Eastern Canada
Flora of the North-Central United States
Flora of the Northeastern United States
Flora of the Southeastern United States
Plants described in 1903
Flora without expected TNC conservation status